Lipopolysaccharide binding protein (LBP) is a protein that in humans is encoded by the LBP gene.

LBP is a soluble acute-phase protein that binds to bacterial lipopolysaccharide (or LPS) to elicit immune responses by presenting the LPS to important cell surface pattern recognition receptors called CD14 and TLR4.

The protein encoded by this gene is involved in the acute-phase immunologic response to gram-negative bacterial infections. Gram-negative bacteria contain a glycolipid, lipopolysaccharide (LPS), on their outer cell wall. Together with bactericidal permeability-increasing protein (BPI), the encoded protein binds LPS and interacts with the CD14 receptor, probably playing a role in regulating LPS-dependent monocyte responses. Studies in mice suggest that the encoded protein is necessary for the rapid acute-phase response to LPS but not for the clearance of LPS from circulation. This protein is part of a family of structurally and functionally related proteins, including BPI, plasma cholesteryl ester transfer protein (CETP), and phospholipid transfer protein (PLTP). Finally, this gene is found on chromosome 20, immediately downstream of the BPI gene.

Clinical significance
LBP exposure induces LBP production. LBP is synthesized by the liver, adipose tissue, and intestinal cells. Dietary glucose and saturated fats acutely increase plasma LBP.

The proinflammatory activity of plasma LPS is increased by LBP, which is higher in obesity.

Plasma LBP is used as a better biomarker of plasma LPS than LPS itself due to the short half-life of LPS.

Interactions
Lipopolysaccharide-binding protein has been shown to interact with CD14, TLR2, TLR4 and the co-receptor MD-2.

References

Further reading

External links
 

Acute-phase proteins